Çiçekdağı is a town and district of Kırşehir Province in the Central Anatolia region of Turkey. According to 2000 census, population of the district is 21,059 of which 6,683 live in the town of Çiçekdağı.

History
From 1867 until 1922, Çiçekdağı was part of Angora vilayet.

Notable natives
Muharrem Ertaş (1913-1984), folk musician
Neşet Ertaş (1938-2012), folk musician

Notes

References

External links
 District governor's official website 
 District municipality's official website 

Populated places in Kırşehir Province
Districts of Kırşehir Province